Victoria Peak may refer to:

 Victoria Peak, the highest point on the island of Hong Kong 
 Victoria Peak (Belize)
 Victoria Peak (Alberta)
 Victoria Peak (British Columbia)
 Victoria Peak (Arizona)
 Victoria Peak (California)
 Victoria Peak (South Africa)
 Victoriapeak, a planet in the Lionrock star system in the constellation Aquarius

See also

Mount Victoria (disambiguation)
Victoria Hill (disambiguation)

Victoria (disambiguation)
Peak (disambiguation)